"I Feel Like Loving You Again" is a song written by Bobby Braddock and Sonny Throckmorton, and recorded by American country music artist T. G. Sheppard. It was first released in 1978 on Throckmorton's debut album, Last Cheater's Waltz. It was re-released in November 1980 as the third single from Sheppard's album Smooth Sailin'.  The song was Sheppard's sixth number one on the country chart.  The single stayed at number one for one week and spent a total of ten weeks on the country chart.

Cover versions
John Conlee recorded a version of the song for his 1981 album With Love.

Charts

References

Sonny Throckmorton songs
T. G. Sheppard songs
John Conlee songs
1980 singles
Songs written by Bobby Braddock
Songs written by Sonny Throckmorton
Song recordings produced by Buddy Killen
Warner Records singles
Curb Records singles
1978 songs